Elina Partõka (born 2 August 1983) is an Estonian former swimmer, who specialized in sprint freestyle events. She is a three-time Olympian (2000, 2004, and 2008), and a daughter of Valentin Partyka, who competed in both 200 and 400 m individual medley at the 1972 Summer Olympics in Munich, Germany, representing the Soviet Union.

Partoka made her first Estonian team, as a 17-year-old swimming teen at the 2000 Summer Olympics in Sydney. There, she failed to reach the semifinals in any of her individual events, finishing twenty-ninth in the 100 m freestyle (57.71), and thirty-first in the 200 m freestyle (2:05.90).

At the 2004 Summer Olympics in Athens, Partõka competed only in the 200 m freestyle. Swimming in heat three, she edged out New Zealand's Alison Fitch to earn a fourth spot and twenty-eighth overall by four hundredths of a second (0.04) in 2:03.54.

Partõka swam for the third time in the 200 m freestyle at the 2008 Summer Olympics in Beijing. She cleared a FINA B-standard entry time of 2:01.75 in the 200 m freestyle from the Slovak Open Championships in Bratislava. She won the second heat by two hundredths of a second (0.02) behind 17-year old Bulgarian swimmer Nina Rangelova, breaking an Estonian record time of 2:00.64. Partõka repeated her luck from Athens, as she shared a twenty-eighth place tie with Brazil's Monique Ferreira in the preliminaries.
She posed nude for Estonian edition of Playboy in April 2009.

See also
 List of Estonian records in swimming

References

External links
Profile – ESBL 
NBC Olympics Profile

1983 births
Living people
Olympic swimmers of Estonia
Swimmers at the 2000 Summer Olympics
Swimmers at the 2004 Summer Olympics
Swimmers at the 2008 Summer Olympics
Estonian female freestyle swimmers
Sportspeople from Donetsk
Sportspeople from Kohtla-Järve
Ukrainian expatriates in Estonia
21st-century Estonian women
Estonian swimming coaches